The Blair Bridge carries the Union Pacific Railroad's Blair Subdivision between the U.S. states of Nebraska and Iowa, across the Missouri River near Blair, Nebraska. It was built in 1883 by the Sioux City and Pacific Rail Road, replacing a car ferry. Automobile traffic crosses via the parallel Blair Bridge (U.S. Route 30).

See also
List of bridges documented by the Historic American Engineering Record in Iowa
List of bridges documented by the Historic American Engineering Record in Nebraska
List of crossings of the Missouri River

References

External links

Union Pacific Railroad bridges
Chicago and North Western Railway
Railroad bridges in Nebraska
Railroad bridges in Iowa
Bridges over the Missouri River
Buildings and structures in Washington County, Nebraska
Transportation buildings and structures in Harrison County, Iowa
Historic American Engineering Record in Nebraska
Historic American Engineering Record in Iowa
Interstate railroad bridges in the United States